Paul Sparks (born October 16, 1971) is an American actor. He is known for his roles as gangster Mickey Doyle in the HBO period drama series Boardwalk Empire, writer Thomas Yates in the Netflix political drama series House of Cards, mall owner John Breem in the Apple TV+ comedy-drama series Physical, attorney David Tellis in the Starz anthology drama series The Girlfriend Experience, and a recurring role in the limited series The Night Of. Sparks has also starred in the films Deception (2008), Afterschool (2008), The Missing Person (2008), Mud (2012), Parkland (2013), Stealing Cars (2015), Thoroughbreds (2017), and The Greatest Showman (2017).

Early life and career
Sparks is a native of Marlow, Oklahoma, and attended Marlow High School, where his father coached football, graduating in 1990. While attending school in Marlow, Paul was a part of the Marlow Outlaw Speech Team (M.O.S.T.) where he was coached by Paula and Gary McConnell. Sparks earned a scholarship to Oklahoma State University to study chemistry, but later transferred to New York University's Tisch School of the Arts. He graduated with a Bachelor of Fine Arts degree in drama in 1995.

In 2010, Sparks began portraying the regular role of Mickey Doyle on HBO's drama series Boardwalk Empire, which was created by Terence Winter and executive produced by Martin Scorsese and Mark Wahlberg. The series ended in 2014, after completing five seasons.

Personal life
Sparks is married to actress Annie Parisse, after meeting in 2005. Together they have two children, son Emmett (born 2009), and daughter Lydia (born 2014). Sparks has diabetes mellitus type 1 and works with the Juvenile Diabetes Research Foundation. He is good friends with fellow actor Michael Shannon; the two have worked together on a number of projects including Waco, The Missing Person, Mud, Boardwalk Empire, and Midnight Special.

Filmography

Film

Television

Stage

Awards and nominations

References

External links
 
 
 

1971 births
20th-century American male actors
21st-century American male actors
American male film actors
American male stage actors
American male television actors
Living people
Male actors from Oklahoma
Oklahoma State University alumni
People from Lawton, Oklahoma
People from Marlow, Oklahoma
Tisch School of the Arts alumni
People with type 1 diabetes